Twentieth Century Eightball is a book collection of comics by Daniel Clowes published by Fantagraphics Books in 2002. It consists of numerous short pieces originally published in Clowes's Eightball comic book and other venues. Most of the contents previously appeared in the earlier, out-of-print collections Lout Rampage! and Orgy Bound, but the book also includes eight new stories.

Contents
Little Enid 
Title Story
Art School Confidential
Cool Your Jets
Ectomorph
The Truth
Ink Studs
The Stroll
Devil Doll? 
Needledick the Bugfucker
Feldman
I Hate You Deeply 
Zubrick and Pogeybait 
Frankie and Johnnie 
Marooned on a Desert Island with the People from the Subway 
Just Another Day 
Hippypants and Peace Bear
Zubrick 
Chicago
Why I Hate Christians
Pogeybait 
On Sports
Sexual Frustration
The Operator
A Message to the People of the Future
The Happy Fisherman
Give it Up!
Grist for the Mill
Ugly Girls
Curtain of Sanity
Playful Obsession
Squirrel Girl and Candypants
Paranoid
I Love You Tenderly
The Party
The Sensual Santa
My Suicide
Eightball
Man-Child
Wallace Wood 
Tits
Tom Pudd
Grip Glutz and Shamrock Squid
You
About the Author

Comics by Daniel Clowes
2002 books
2002 in comics